"Ten Feet Away" is a song written by Billy Sherrill, Troy Seals and Max D. Barnes, and recorded by American country music artist Keith Whitley.  It was released in June 1986 as the third single from the album L.A. to Miami.  The song reached number 9 on the Billboard Hot Country Singles & Tracks chart.

Content
The song is a midtempo description of instant attraction.

Critical reception
Kip Kirby, of Billboard magazine reviewed the song favorably, saying that Whitley is "more intimate and less hard-edged here than in recent outings."

Chart performance
"Ten Feet Away" debuted at number 72 on the U.S. Billboard Hot Country Singles & Tracks for the week of June 21, 1986.

References

1986 singles
1986 songs
Keith Whitley songs
Songs written by Billy Sherrill
Songs written by Troy Seals
Songs written by Max D. Barnes
RCA Records singles